Ras association domain-containing protein 9 (RASSF9), also known as PAM COOH-terminal interactor protein 1 (PCIP1) or peptidylglycine alpha-amidating monooxygenase COOH-terminal interactor (PAMCI) is a protein that in humans is encoded by the RASSF9 gene.

Function
RASSF9 the N-terminal RASSF family member Ras association (RalGDS/AF-6) domain family (N-terminal) member 9 12q21.31, is one of two new wild type RASSF9 and RASSF10 proteins. Three proteins that interact with a fragment of the PAM cytosolic domain containing signaling switch I and II the RA1 and RA2ras complex. RASSF7, the first member of the N-terminal RASSF family is required for mitosis. RASSF9 is recently found to be involved in regulation of epidermal homeostasis.

Regulation
The mutant  proregion encoding PAM COOH-terminal interactor protein-1 (P-CIP1) is comparable to that of human band 4.1-like TF (blood plasma protein) as a recycling endosomal pathway in microtubule locations, does NOT bind RasGTP. Specificity of interaction may all be related to microtubule locations of the endosomal-lysosomal system localized within the centrosome with Transferrin and different Ras proteins or with that one (N-Ras), but on the other hand, it interacts with three (Ha-Ras, Ki-Ras, and Rap)  residues function, blocked by a mutation that affects Ras effector function is the critical product of the t (6:11) abnormality associated with some human leukemias. Phosphatidylinositol-3-kinase make contacts with both (6:11) switch I and II regions of ras and yeast adenylyl cyclase molecules carrying these mutations are rendered unactivatable by Ras in vitro.  Ras-interacting residues, are appreciably different from that of RalGDS-RBD through their C-terminal Ras-binding domains (RBD). Such outliers as afadin/AF-6 and Rin1  were found to inhibit the binding of Raf to Ras. Adenylyl cyclase molecules carrying these mutations are rendered unactivatable by Ras in vitro with the Ras-associating domain-RA,   not all RA domains bind RasGTP it is a primary Ras-binding site.

Interactions
PAM Peptidyl-glycine alpha-amidating monooxygenase precursor (PAM)
RASSF7 Ras association domain-containing protein 7 (HRAS1-related cluster protein 1)
BLOC1S2 Biogenesis of lysosome-related organelles complex-1 subunit 2 (BLOC subunit 2)
TF Serotransferrin precursor (Transferrin) (Beta-1-metal- binding globulin)
RAB11A Ras-related protein Rab-11A

References

Further reading